Arnaud Duncker (born 7 May 1971) is a retired French football midfielder.

References

1971 births
Living people
French footballers
Valenciennes FC players
Lille OSC players
Association football midfielders
Ligue 1 players
Ligue 2 players